Francisco "Chico" Díaz Rocha (born 16 February 1959) is a Brazilian actor.

Biography
Francisco Díaz Rocha was born in Mexico City. He is the son of Juan Díaz Bordenave, a Paraguayan journalist and pedagogue, and Maria Cândida, a Brazilian translator. He was raised in Rio de Janeiro, where their parents decided to live in 1968.

He was married to actress Cecília Santana, with whom he has a son called Antônio. He is currently married to actress Sílvia Buarque, with whom he has a daughter called Irene.

Selected filmography
 Gabriela, Cravo e Canela (1983)
 Quilombo (1984)
 Avaete, Seed of Revenge (1985)
 The Man in the Black Cape (1986)
 Where the River Runs Black (1986)
 The Third Bank of the River (1994)
 Perfumed Ball (1996)
 Força de um Desejo (1999)
 Mango Yellow (2002)
 The Forest (2002)
 América (2005)
 Sonhos de Peixe (2006)
 Paraíso Tropical (2007)
 A Favorita (2008)
O Contador de Histórias (aka The Story of Me) (2009)
 Gabriela (2012)

References

External links

1959 births
Living people
Male actors from Mexico City
Mexican emigrants to Brazil
Male actors from Rio de Janeiro (city)
Brazilian people of Paraguayan descent
Brazilian male film actors
Brazilian male television actors